Love Can Build a Bridge is a video album by American country music duo The Judds. It was released on November 23, 1990 via the MPI Media Group and was produced by Martin Fischer. It was The Judds' third video album in their career and contained a series of live recordings from their final tour together. The album eventually certified platinum in the United States.

Background, content and release
In 1990, The Judds announced their disbandment following Naomi Judd's diagnosis of Hepatitis C. Later that year, the duo released their final studio album, also called Love Can Build a Bridge. A music video was filmed for the title track and a final tour was also announced. A film crew followed The Judds on their final tour and recorded some of their live concert footage. The results of their footage were inputted into the release of this video album. This included some of the duo's hits from their last album, such as "Born to Be Blue". The video album also contained interviews and scenes from Naomi Judd's wedding to husband Larry Strickland. The video itself was produced by Martin Fischer and was directed by Bud Schaetzle.

On November 23, 1990, Love Can Build a Bridge was released via the MPI Media Group. It marked the duo's second video album release in their career. It was released as a VHS cassette, containing sixty minutes of material. In 1991, the album was certified platinum in sales from the Recording Industry Association of America for selling over 1,000,000 copies in the United States. It was The Judds' third video album to receive a certification from the RIAA.

Track listing

Personnel
All credits are adapted from the liner notes of Love Can Build a Bridge.

 Martin Fischer – producer
 Michael Salomon – editor
 Bud Schaetzle – director
 Bret Wolcott – associate producer

Certifications

Release history

References

1990 video albums
The Judds video albums
RCA Records video albums